A trades hall is a building where trade unions meet together, or work from cooperatively, as a local representative organisation, known as a labour council or trades hall council. The term is commonly used in England, New Zealand, Scotland and Australia.  They are sometimes called a union hall, or labour temple in North America (see, for instance, Finnish Labour Temple, Labor Temple Building, Union Hall (Danforth, Maine), etc.)

They are sometimes colloquially called "the worker's parliament".

See also 
 Labour council
 Union Hall (disambiguation)
 
 Johannesburg Trades Hall
 Trades Hall of National Training School for Women and Girls
 Trades Hall, Glasgow

Australian labour movement
Labour movement in the United Kingdom